Champion Lakes Provincial Park is a provincial park in the West Kootenay region of British Columbia, Canada, located northeast of the city of Trail in the province's West Kootenay region.

The park was established by Order-in-Council in 1955. Its boundaries were adjusted in 2000 to approximately 1,245 hectares and again in 2004 to approximately 1,452 hectares.

Location

Facilities

Camping, swimming and hiking trails are available in summer. In winter, there is an extensive network of Nordic ski trails, groomed and tracked by volunteers from the Beaver Valley Cross-Country Ski Club.

References

Provincial parks of British Columbia
West Kootenay
1955 establishments in British Columbia
Protected areas established in 1955
Lakes of British Columbia
Kootenay Land District